Sean Michael Leonard "Big Sean" Anderson, is an American hip hop recording artist. Over the years he has received or been nominated for numerous awards, starting with his debut album Finally Famous.

ASCAP

ASCAP Pop Awards

BET

BET Awards

BET Hip Hop Awards

Billboard Music Awards

Detroit Music Awards

!
|-
|rowspan="3"| 2017
|Twenty88 (with Jhené Aiko)
|Detroit Music Award for Outstanding National Major Label Recording
|
|rowspan="4"| 
|-
|"Bounce Back"
|Detroit Music Award for Outstanding National Single
|
|-
|"No More Interviews"
|rowspan="2"| Detroit Music Award for Outstanding Video / Major Budget
|
|-
|align=center|2018
|"Bounce Back"
|
|-

Grammy Awards
To date, Big Sean has received six Grammy Award nominations.

iHeartRadio Music Awards

MTV

MTV Europe Music Awards

MTV Video Music Awards

People's Choice Awards

Soul Train Music Awards

NAACP Image Awards

YouTube Music Awards

References

External links
 

Big Sean